The 1999 CAF Champions League was the 35th awarding of Africa's premier club football tournament prize organized by the Confederation of African Football (CAF), and the 3rd prize under the CAF Champions League format. Raja Casablanca of Morocco defeated ES Tunis of Tunisia on penalties in the final to win their third title.

Qualifying rounds

Preliminary round

First round

Second round

Group stage

Group A

Group B

Knockout stage

Final

Top goalscorers

The top scorers from the 1999 CAF Champions League are as follows:

External links
Champions' Cup 1999 - rsssf.com

 
1999 in African football
CAF Champions League seasons